Crystal Alicia Garrett (born 1986) is Miss South Carolina 2007. She made the top 16 at Miss America 2008. At Miss South Carolina 2006, she placed in the top 10.

References

External links 
 Crystal Alicia Garrett at Miss South Carolina

1986 births
Living people
Miss America 2008 delegates
People from Columbia, South Carolina
University of South Carolina alumni